Rhys or Reese  Llewellyn may refer to:

Rhys Llewellyn (rugby), rugby union player in 2011 IRB Junior World Championship
Sir Rhys Llewellyn, 2nd Baronet (1910–1978), Welsh mining executive, soldier, author and dignitary
Reese J. Llewellyn (1860s–1936), Welsh-American businessman